= American Desk =

Prospective Office for trade deal

The American Desk is a prospective office for trade deals at the White House announced by President-elect Donald Trump in October 2016. Mr. Trump said he intends to merge bureaux for trade policy in the Office of the United States Trade Representative, the United States Department of Commerce and other agencies with a new Office of Trade, which will report to the American Desk. The aim of the American Desk is to fold layers of inefficient bureaucracy, and prevent the delocalization of US corporate entities who employ US citizens.

In my administration, all trade policymaking will be consolidated in one Office. It will report to an American Desk and it will be located inside the Department of Commerce. The mission of the American Desk will be to protect the economic interests of the American worker, and the national interests of the United States.

— Donald Trump, October 20, 2016 speech in Ohio
